"Asthena" subditaria is a species of Lepidoptera in the family geometrid moth . Geometridae first described by William Warren in 1906. It is found on New Guinea.

Taxonomy
The species does not belong to the genus Asthena or even the tribe Asthenini, but has not been moved to another genus.

References

Moths described in 1906
Asthena
Moths of New Guinea